The 1838 Grand Liverpool Steeplechase was the last of three unofficial annual precursors of a Handicap Steeple-chase, later to become known as the Grand National Steeplechase horse race which took place at Aintree Racecourse near Liverpool on Monday 5 March 1838 and attracted a field of only three runners. This race did not carry the prestige of the future Grand Nationals and its status as an official Grand National was revoked some time between 1862 and 1873.

Competitors and betting
Three competitors faced the starter and were quoted as follows.

 1/2 Favourite, The Duke the winner of the 1836 & 1837 runnings, ridden by his partner from the first of those victories, Captain Martin Becher
 2/1 Sir William, ridden by Allen McDonough
 3/1 Scamp, also a debut ride for Mr Clarendon

The race

The race was relatively incident free. Scamp refused when leading on the first circuit and The Duke looked set to record a third consecutive victory, entering the race course proper with a good lead over Sir William. The dual winner tired rapidly and was first passed by Sir William and then also by Scamp to finish last of the three with Sir William winning by a distance of forty yards in a time of fifteen minutes, a minute slower than the previous year.

Aftermath

For many years after this event the race was regarded as the third running of the Grand National by racegoers and pressmen alike, however this stance began to change during the 1860s when national newspapers began listing the former winners of the National back only as far as 1839. When the official honours board at Aintree was erected in 1894 it stated that the race of 1838 was run at a nearby course in Maghull and that the winner was a horse named Sir Henry, ridden by Mr Olliver against nine rivals.

Racing returns from this period show that racing at Maghull ceased in 1835 and that there was no horse in training in 1838 named Sir Henry. The only jockey named Olliver in racing at the time was Tom Olliver and on the date of the race he was riding at St Albans.

For over a century the detail recorded on the honours board was accepted as fact until evidence was presented to show the real events of the 1838 Great Liverpool chase. While it is now accepted among the majority of racing writers that the 1838 race was indeed run at Aintree and not Maghull it is still the official view that the lack of prestige in the race prior to 1839 warrants its continued omission from being declared an official Grand National.

Finishing order

References

Grand National
 1838
Grand National
History of Liverpool
1830s in Liverpool
March 1838 sports events